Tongguan District is an urban district under the administration of the city of Tongling, Anhui Province, People's Republic of China. The district's postal code is 244000 and 244031. Tongguan District was established after the merge of Tongguanshan District and Shizishan District in October 2015.

Administrative divisions
Tongguan District administers nine subdistricts and one town. These include :
Subdistricts
 Changjianglu Subdistrict, Tongguanshan Subdistrict , Yangjiashan Subdistrict, Shichenglu Subdistrict, Saobagou Subdistrict (Henggang Subdistrict, Shizishan Subdistrict, Xinmiao Subdistrict, Fenghuangshan Subdistrict, Fanshan  Subdistrict 
Towns
 Dongjiao

References

County-level divisions of Anhui
Tongling